Adrian Cox (born 8 September 1980) is a former Australian rules footballer who played with Hawthorn in the AFL.

A half back flanker, Cox was a strong rebound player and used his pace to run the ball up the wing. He had a trademark bald head which made him instantly recognisable on the field and made his debut in 1999 after being a member of the pre season premiership side.

As playing coach, he steered Sale to a West Gippsland Latrobe Football League premiership in 2008.

External links

Profile at Hawksheadquarters

1980 births
Living people
Australian rules footballers from Victoria (Australia)
Hawthorn Football Club players
Gippsland Power players
Sale Football Club players
Sale Football Club coaches